The  consists of historical and existing pottery kilns in Japan and the Japanese pottery and porcelain ware they primarily produced.

The list contains kilns of the post-Heian period. Not listed are ancient earthenware pottery such as Jōmon pottery, Yayoi pottery, Haji pottery, Sue pottery, Kamui ware, etc. which are general topics whose origins and production cannot be linked to just one specific kiln. Shimamono are objects that were imported from southeast Asia, but later produced locally as well. Mishima pottery despite its name is of Korean origin.

Some of the existing kilns and the main ceramic wares have been designated by the government Agency for Cultural Affairs as an Intangible Cultural Property as regulated by the Law for the Protection of Cultural Properties (1950). In addition the Ministry of Economy, Trade and Industry (METI) has designated others as "traditional handicraft workshops".
It is primarily a craft for everyday life usage 
The manufacturing process has to be largely done manually
Has a history of over 100 years, with production continuing to use traditional technologies and techniques
The type of main raw material has remained the same for over 100 years.
Artisans producing the craft have to have a certain degree of scale to be counted as a regional industry

The listing follows a geographical arrangement from north to southern Japan. It is divided by regions, then prefectures, then within the prefectures in alphabetical order. Those designated by the government are in bold letters, those listed under Enshū are marked with a 7 and those by Koyama with a 6 sign in brackets.

Hokkaidō 
 Kita Arashiyama
 Kobushi-yaki
 Otaru-yaki
 Tōraku-yaki

Tōhoku

Aomori 
 Hachinohe-yaki
 Tsugaru-yaki

Akita 
 Naraoka-yaki
 Shiraiwa-yaki

Fukushima 
 Aizuhongō-yaki
 Aizukeizan-yaki
 Nihonmatsubanko-yaki
 Ōborisōma-yaki
 Sōmakoma-yaki
 Tajimabanko-yaki

Iwate 
 Dai-yaki
 Fujisawa-yaki
 Kajichō-yaki
 Kokuji-yaki

Miyagi 
 Daigamori-yaki
 Kirigome-yaki
 Tsutsumi-yaki

Yamagata 
 Goten-yaki
 Hirashimizu-yaki
 Kami no hata-yaki
 Narushima-yaki
 Shinjō Higashiyama-yaki

Kantō

Gunma 
 Jijōji-yaki
 Shibutami-yaki 
 Tsukiyono-yaki

Ibaraki 
 Kasama-yaki

Saitama 
 Hannō-yaki

Tochigi 
 Koisago-yaki
 Mashiko-yaki
 Mikamo-yaki

Tokyō 
 Imado-yaki

Chūbu

Aichi 
 Akazu-yaki 
 Hōraku-yaki 
 Inuyama-yaki 
 Seto-yaki  (6)
 Ofukei-yaki
 Tokoname-yaki  (6)

Fukui 
 Echizen-yaki (6)

Gifu 
 Koito-yaki
 Mino-yaki
 Oribe-yaki
 Shino-yaki
 Shibukusa-yaki
 Yamada-yaki

Ishikawa 
 Kutani-yaki
 Ōhi-yaki
 Suzu-yaki

Nagano 
 Matsushiro-yaki
 Obayashi-yaki
 Takatō-yaki
 Tenryūkyō-yaki

Niigata 
 Anchi-yaki
 Muramatsu-yaki
 Mumyōi-yaki

Shizuoka 
 Moriyama-yaki
 Shitoro-yaki (7) 
 Shizuhata-yaki

Toyama 
 Etchū Maruyama-yaki
 Etchū Seto-yaki
 Kosugi-yaki
 Sansuke-yaki

Yamanashi 
 Nōketsu-yaki

Kansai

Hyōgo 
 Awaji ware, also known as Minpei or Mimpei ware 
 Akōunka-yaki
 Izushi-yaki
 Minpei-yaki
 Tanba Tachikui-yaki (6)

Kyōto 
 Asahi-yaki (7)
 Kiyomizu-yaki
 Kyō-yaki
 Raku-yaki

Mie 
 Akogi-yaki
 Banko-yaki
 Iga-yaki
 Mihama-yaki

Nara 
 Akahada-yaki (7)

Ōsaka 
 Kikkō-yaki
 Kosobe-yaki (7)

Shiga 
 Hatta-yaki
 Konan-yaki
 Kotō-yaki
 Shigaraki-yaki (6)
 Zeze-yaki (7)

Wakayama 
 Zuishi-yaki

Chūgoku

Hiroshima 
 Himetani-yaki
 Miyajima-yaki

Okayama 
 Bizen-yaki (6)
 Hashima-yaki
 Mushiake-yaki
 Sakazu-yaki

Shimane 
 Banshōzan-yaki
 Fujina-yaki
 Hachiman-yaki
 Iwami-yaki
 Mijiro-yaki
 Mori-yaki
 Sodeshi-yaki
 Shussai-yaki
 Yunotsu-yaki

Tottori 
 Inkyūzan-yaki
 Hosshōji-yaki
 Kazuwa-yaki
 Uradome-yaki
 Ushino-yaki

Yamaguchi 
 Hagi-yaki
 Seiri-yaki
 Sueda-yaki

Shikoku

Ehime 
 Rakuzan-yaki
 Suigetsu-yaki
 Tobe-yaki

Kagawa 
 Kamikage-yaki
 Okamoto-yaki
 Rihei-yaki

Kōchi 
 Nōsayama-yaki
 Odo-yaki
 Uraharano-yaki

Tokushima 
 Ōtani-yaki

Kyūshū

Fukuoka 
 Agano-yaki (7)
 Futagawa-yaki
 Kamachi-yaki
 Koishiwara-yaki
 Takatori-yaki (7)

Kagoshima 
 Satsuma-yaki
 Ryūmonji-yaki
 Tanegashima-yaki

Kumamoto 
 Amakusa tōjiki
 Kodai-yaki
 Shōdai-yaki

Miyazaki 
 Komatsubara-yaki
 Tojō-yaki

Nagasaki 
 Hasami-yaki
 Mikawachi-yaki
 Nagayo-yaki
 Utsutsugawa-yaki

Oita 
 Onta-yaki

Saga 
 Arita-yaki
 Imari-yaki
 Hizen Yoshida-yaki
 Hizen Ozaki-yaki
 Karatsu-yaki
 Shiraishi-yaki

Ryukyu Islands 
 Ryūkyū-yaki
 Tsuboya-yaki

References

Further reading 
 

 
Ceramics sites
ceramics sites